The Provisional Political Regulation of the Mexican Empire were political regulations that governed the early days of the nation of Mexican Empire. It granted effect to the laws, orders and regulations promulgated until February 24, 1821 with the Plan of Iguala; as well as the laws, orders and decrees issued in consequence of the Independence of Mexico with the triumphant entry of the Trigarante Army in Mexico City.

The Regulation consisted of a preamble and an article divided into eight sections, which in turn were divided into chapters and further into articles, with the exception of article 25, which hosted the 15 bases contained of the imperial decree of November 2, 1822.

Territorial organization 

At the time of the promulgation of the Provisional Regulation in 1822, the nation of New Spain was composed of 12 municipalities (Arizpe, San Luis Potosi, Durango, Zacatecas, Guadalajara, Guanajuato, Veracruz, Valladolid, Mexico, Puebla, Antequera of Oaxaca and Mérida of Yucatán) and 4 governments (Nueva California, Vieja California, Nuevo México and Tlaxcala), so after the proclamation of the Mexican Empire, the Captaincy General of Guatemala was annexed to the national geography, leaving finally 26 provinces.

References

Mexican Empire